VanDutch Yachts is a luxury yachting brand owned by Cantiere del Pardo. Originally founded by the Dutch VanDutch Inc., the brand was acquired in 2020 by the italian shipyard and today continues the design, production, and sale of motorboats in the luxury segment of the international yachting market together with the other two owned brands, Grand Soleil Yachts and Pardo Yachts. The headquarters and production site are in Forlì (Central Italy), with representative offices, VanDutch Centers, and branches in Europe and America.

About VanDutch 

VanDutch is internationally known for its design, functionality, and lifestyle surrounding the brand. Founded in 2008, the first model, the VanDutch 40, was introduced to the market the following year. Today the range includes five motorboats between 32 and 75 feet.

VanDutch, thanks to its strong recognition, holds many collaborations with other luxury brands such as Dior, McLaren, Red Bull, and Hublot. In addition to many partnerships built over the years, notable celebrities own or enjoy onboard VanDutch yachts: Cristiano Ronaldo, David Beckham, Dwyane Wade, Leonardo DiCaprio, Mark Cuban, Ryan Phillippe, Simon Cowell, Samantha Hoopes, and Samuel Hübinette are part of this list of brand lovers.

VanDutch regularly participates in lifestyle marketing activities during international boat shows, boat presentations at dealers' locations, open days, and initiatives with brands from other industries.

The VanDutch Fleet 
The range of VanDutch yachts is currently available in 5 models: VD 32, VD 40, VD 48, VD 56, VD 75. The boats differ in size, capacity, functionality, layout options, and engines.

The sales and service network currently counts on the sales and after-sales network of Moniga del Garda (Italy), Saint Tropez (France), Ibiza (Spain), Mallorca (Spain), and Miami (Florida, USA).

Gallery

References 

Goods manufactured in the Netherlands
Companies based in Friesland
Yacht building companies
Motorboats
Dutch boat builders
Dutch companies established in 2008
Privately held companies of the Netherlands